UIF Corporation (UIF) is an American financial service company headquartered in Southfield, Michigan. It provides residential and commercial financing based on faith based principles for the religious minorities who for religious beliefs want to avoid paying or receiving fixed interest contracts. UIF, is the first faith based banking subsidiary run entirely on faith based principles and offers faith based commercial real-estate financing and home financing through their Partnership, Murabaha and Ijara programs.

UIF has received national media attention from NPR and The New York Times for its unique services.  UIF’s faith based lending program has been highlighted in a speech of the Federal Reserve Bank of New York and in the official magazine of the Federal Reserve Bank of Richmond.

Products offered 
UIF currently offers faith based financing in the following states California, Colorado, Connecticut, Florida, Georgia, Illinois, Indiana, Kansas, Kentucky, Maryland, Massachusetts, Michigan, Minnesota, Missouri, New Jersey, New York, North Carolina, Ohio, Oklahoma, Oregon, Pennsylvania, Tennessee, Texas, Virginia, Washington and Wisconsin.

Murabaha is also known as an “installment sale” contract. In this case, UIF will act as an agent for University Bank and purchase the property a customer identifies. UIF will then sell the property back the customer at an agreed-upon, marked-up price. Down payments for UIF's Murabaha contracts may be as low as 5% in certain states. A customer's down payment toward the purchase price represents their initial investment in the property. A customer's monthly payment is divided into two portions — acquisition and profit. As a customer makes their monthly payments, the acquisition balance is reduced, thereby increasing a customer's investment in the home.

Ijara financing is a redeemable lease contract based on the principle of Ijara wa Iqtina, (lease to own). The process is simple: a customer identifies a property and an independent Trust acquires it on the customer's behalf and leases it back to them. The customer makes monthly payments to the Trust composed of a rent portion and an acquisition payment. At the end of the contract term, the Trust transfers the house ownership to the customer's name. The customer now owns the property free and clear. The minimum down payment for Ijara contracts is typically 30%. A customer's payment on-account represents their beneficial rights in the property. A customer's monthly payments include rent and further payments on-account, thereby increasing the customer's beneficial rights. A customer can acquire full title to the property when the sum of their payments on-account equals the original purchase price. The original purchase price is the goal toward which the customer is always working; UIF does not adjust it over the life of the lease. This eliminates gharar (doubtful practices), or any uncertainty when it comes to a customer's financial arrangement.

Partnership financing is based on the financing principle of Musharaka. Under this arrangement two parties (Financing Company aka UIF and the Customer) come together to purchase an asset. In this case “the House” or "a Building".  Each party contributes their monetary share towards the purchase price of the house or building. Customer contributes in the form of a down payment and UIF's contribution is the financing amount. Since the customer uses the home for his or her benefit, a rent is paid to UIF for using their share of the property. The rent is the “profit” UIF derives for investing in this partnership. Customer acquires the property from UIF over a 10, 15, 20 or 30 year term in monthly payments.  The monthly payment the customer pays each month to UIF consists of two portions: Buyout Price and Use Payment (aka Rent). Over time, the customer buys out UIF’s share and upon final payment takes full ownership of the property. In UIF's Musharaka (Partnership) program they don’t charge a monthly LLC fee.

Shariah compliance for Muslim customers 

For its Muslim customers, UIF offers products in the real estate and financial business by utilizing the best practices in the field of religious compliance. The initial fatawa for our products were produced by Sheikh Yusuf DeLorenzo and Sheikh Nizam Yaquby through Shape Financial Corp. These have been subsequently reviewed by other scholars including Dr. Muhamed Shleibak and Sheikh Muhamed Becic. UIF continues its consultative and audit relationship with Shape Financial Corp. who maintains an active team of Shariah scholars and auditors providing ongoing guidance and support.  UIF’s Residential Installment Sale program has also been approved by US based advisory group Straightway Ethical LLC. which includes scholars such as Sheikh Taha Abdul-Basser, Sheikh Ashraf Gomma Ali, Mufti Abdullah Nana and Sheikh Faraz Rabbani.  Most recently, both home financing models were reviewed and approved by Amanie Advisors, which includes scholars such as Dr. Mohamed Ali Elgari, Dr. Mohd Daud Bakar, Dr. Muhammad Amin Ali Al-Qattan, and Dr. Osama Al-Dereai.  All Scholars are experts in the field of Islamic Finance and follow standards adopted by the Accounting and Auditing Organization of Islamic Financial Institutions (AAOIFI).

References

External links 

 

Financial services companies of the United States
Companies based in Southfield, Michigan
Companies based in Ann Arbor, Michigan
Islamic banks